Georgy (Yury) Leonidovich Pyatakov (6 August 1890 – 30 January 1937) was a leader of the Bolsheviks and a key Soviet politician during and after the 1917 Russian Revolution.

Biography

Pre-revolution 
His father, Leonid Timofeyevich Pyatakov (1847–1915), was a Russian nobleman and chief engineer and director of the factory as well as co-owner of Musatov, Pyatakov, Sirotin, and Co.

Pyatakov first became politically active as an anarchist in secondary school. He studied at the Faculty of Economics of St Petersburg University, until he was expelled in 1910. While studying at the school, he participated in a 1905-7 revolutionary movement in Kyiv. After his expulsion, he joined the Russian Social Democratic Labour Party in 1910. Two years later, he joined the Bolshevik faction and was arrested the same year. From April 1912, he was arrested several times, and spent a year and a half exiled to Siberia with his partner, Yevgenia Bosch, in the village of Usolye, Irkutsk.

In October 1914, he escaped from exile through Japan and the USA to Switzerland, where they joined the émigré revolutionary community. From 1915, together with Vladimir Lenin, he edited the journal Kommunist. Disagreements arose between Lenin and Pyatakov over the right of national self-determination, where Pyatakov advocated for the abolition of nations. This led to Pyatakov resigning from the editorial office of the Kommunist magazine and leaving for Stockholm. Lenin wrote to Inessa Armand about Pyatakov and Bosch.

In 1916, Pyatokov was expelled from Sweden and moved to Oslo, Norway (then called Kristiania) with Bosch.

Pyatakov and Bosch remained together until she committed suicide by self-inflicted gunshot in January 1925, after hearing that Trotsky had been forced to resign as leader of the Red Army, as well as in pain from her heart condition and tuberculosis.

Revolution and Civil War 
After the February Revolution, Pyatakov returned to Russia from Norway where he was arrested at the border for his false passport, escorted to Petrograd, then to Kyiv. He lived in Ukraine from March 1917, becoming a member, then in April, chairman, of the Kyiv Committee of the RSDLP. He was repeatedly elected a member of the Central Committee but opposed the Ukrainian nationalists and stood for transfer of power to the All-Ukrainian Congress of Soviets of Workers', Soldiers' and Peasants' Deputies. Pyatakov also headed the Kyiv Military Revolutionary Committee, declared that the party had to end the idea of self-identification of every nation, and stood for anti-chauvinistic international principles.

In 1918, Pyatakov was a leader of a group of Left Communists in Ukraine. He was one of the initiators of Communist Party (Bolsheviks) of Ukraine. At the First Congress of CP(b)U in Moscow, Pyatakov was elected as Central Committee Secretary and headed the opposition to the Hetman Rebellion in August 1918. From October 1918 to mid-January 1919, he was a head of the Provisional Worker’s and Peasant’s Government formed by Bolsheviks for the fight with the Directory, taking part in the formation of the Red Army in Ukraine.

In March 1919, while attending the 8th Congress of the Russian Communist Party, he unsuccessfully opposed Lenin's position on national self-determination.

His opinion on some points of the theory and tactics of the revolutionary struggle contradicted that of the party's Central Committee. He was one of Vladimir Lenin's fiercest opponents on the national problem regarding both the course to be followed towards the socialist revolution and the Treaty of Brest-Litovsk, the Bolsheviks' peace settlement with Germany.

He collaborated with Nikolai Bukharin to co-author the chapter on "The Economic Categories of Capitalism in the Transition Period" in The Economics of the Transformation Period, published in 1920.

From 1 January to 16 February 1920, he led the Registration Directorate, the military intelligence arm of the Red Army that went on to become GRU.

Post-Civil War 
Pyatakov was placed in charge of the management of Donbas coal mining industry in 1921 and became a deputy head of the Gosplan (State Planning Committee) of the RSFSR in 1922 and deputy Chairman of the Supreme Council of the National Economy of the Soviet Union.

The likeness of Pyatakov's Left Communist views and Trotsky’s ideas led to his participation in practically all opposition trends that were designated as "Trotskyist".

He was expelled from the party for belonging to the "Trotskyite-Zinovievite" bloc but was reinstated in 1928 after he renounced Trotskyism, and became Deputy Head of Heavy Industries. He was appointed Chairman of the Board of the Soviet State Bank in 1929 and held the position for a year.

Arrest and execution 
In the summer of 1936, Pyatakov was appointed as a witness by Joseph Stalin at the First Moscow Trial of Kamenev and Zinoviev. However, two weeks before the trial, he was again accused of anti-party and anti-Soviet activity and in early September 1936, he was withdrawn from the Central Committee and expelled from the party. At his trial, he was accused of conspiring with Trotsky in connection with the case of the so-called Parallel anti-Soviet Party Centre to overthrow the Soviet government. Pyatakov was accused of joining a conspiracy with the Nazis to seize power in the Soviet Union, in return promising to reward Germany with large tracts of Soviet territory, including Ukraine. The prosecution (Yezhov and Yagoda) presented evidence that he had secretly met with Trotsky in Norway for those purposes. Stalin was unsure of these claims and undecided on Pyatakov, but on 30 January 1937, he was sentenced to death, and executed on 1 February.

Pyatakov was posthumously rehabilitated and reinstated in the party on 13 June 1988 by the decision of the Council of People's Commissars of the Central Committee of the CPSU under Mikhail Gorbachev.

References

External links
 Biography
 Mentioning of Leonid Pyatakov
 Biography of his brother Leonid

1890 births
1937 deaths
People from Horodyshche
People from Cherkassky Uyezd
Russians in Ukraine
Russian Social Democratic Labour Party members
Old Bolsheviks
Communist Party of the Soviet Union members
Left communists
Left Opposition
Party leaders of the Soviet Union
Chairmen of the Board of Gosbank
Communist Party of Ukraine (Soviet Union) politicians
First Secretaries of the Communist Party of Ukraine (Soviet Union)
Chairpersons of the Council of Ministers of Ukraine
People of the Russian Revolution
Russian revolutionaries
Russian Revolution in Ukraine
GRU officers
Cheka
Saint Petersburg State University alumni
Russian exiles to Siberia
Emigrants from the Russian Empire to Japan
Emigrants from the Russian Empire to the United States
Emigrants from the Russian Empire to Sweden
Emigrants from the Russian Empire to Norway
Soviet expatriates in France
Trial of the Seventeen
Great Purge victims from Russia
Executed Russian people
Russian people executed by the Soviet Union
Soviet rehabilitations
Members of the Communist Party of the Soviet Union executed by the Soviet Union